This is a list the fourteen departments of El Salvador by Human Development Index.

Departments

References

 
Society of El Salvador
El Salvador
Human Development Index